PPV, ppv or pPv may refer to:

Technology
 Pay-per-view on cable or satellite television
 People Powered Vehicle, a human-powered vehicle from 1970
 Police Pursuit Vehicles, the most common police vehicles in the United States and Canada

Science and mathematics
 Pars plana vitrectomy, a common ocular surgery procedure
 Parts per volume, a unit of volume mixing ratio
 Plum pox virus, a plant virus
 Pneumococcal polysaccharide vaccine, a pneumococcal vaccine
 Poly(p-phenylene vinylene), a conjugated polymer
 Porcine parvovirus, a virus causing reproductive failure of swine
 Positive predictive value in statistics
 Post-perovskite (pPv), in geophysics
 Processus vaginalis or patent processus vaginalis
 Pusat Pemberian Vaksin, or vaccination centres in Malaysia

Other uses
 Pajamäen Pallo-Veikot, a football team in western Helsinki, Finland
 Price variance, or purchase price variance, in accounting
 Public/Private Ventures, a former nonprofit social research and policy organization
 Port Protection Seaplane Base, IATA code

See also